The Morning of the Streltsy Execution is a painting by Vasily Ivanovich Surikov, painted in 1881. It illustrates the public execution after the Streltsy's failed attempted uprising before the walls of the Kremlin. It shows the display of power the Russian government had during the late years of the 17th century.

The painting can be found at the Tretyakov Gallery in Moscow.

References

1881 paintings
Collections of the Tretyakov Gallery
Cultural depictions of Peter the Great